Alabagrus muisca is a species of parasitoid wasp in the subfamily of Agathidinae of the family Braconidae. The wasp was described by Sharkey in 1988.

Etymology 
This species is named for the Muisca people, who inhabited the Altiplano Cundiboyacense in Colombia, where the wasp was found.

Description 
Forewing entirely and evenly black. Hind tibia black; maxillary and labial palpomeres yellowish orange; mid tarsus black.

See also 

List of flora and fauna named after the Muisca

References 

Braconidae
Endemic fauna of Colombia
Hymenoptera of South America
Arthropods of Colombia
Altiplano Cundiboyacense
Muisca
Insects described in 1988